The Feather is an award for a person within the Dutch music industry who has made an outstanding contribution to the Dutch music product in the past year. The Feather is awarded on an annual basis during the European music conference and showcase festival Eurosonic Noorderslag in Groningen.

Winners
 1997 - Tony Berk
 1998 - Saskia Slegers
 2000 - Rinny Schreijenberg
 2001 - Roy Teysse
 2002 - Ferry Roosenboom
 2003 - Willem Venema
 2004 - Marcel Albers
 2005 - Kees de Koning
 2006 - Paul Brinks
 2007 - Theo Roos
 2008 - Jerney Kaagman
 2009 - Jaap Buijs
 2010 - Pieter van Bodegraven
 2011 - Maykel Piron
 2012 - David Schreurs
 2013 - André de Raaff
 2014 - André de Raaff
 2015 - Eelko van Kooten
 2016 - Wilbert Mutsaers
 2017 - 
 2018 - Kees van der Hoeven
 2019 - Peter Smidt

References

Feather